Daniel Edward Ryan (9 September 1870 – 31 March 1953) was an Australian politician.

He was born in Franklin. In 1915 he was elected to the Tasmanian House of Assembly as a Liberal member for Franklin in a by-election following Norman Ewing's resignation. He did not contest the next election held in 1916. Ryan died in Hobart in 1953.

References

1870 births
1953 deaths
Commonwealth Liberal Party politicians
Members of the Tasmanian House of Assembly